Jack Hovater was a college football player and high school football coach. He was also once president of the Alabama State League.  Hovater was a prominent running back and tackle for the Alabama Crimson Tide; twice selected All-Southern and captain of the 1917 team. He played with two other Hovater brothers on the 1916 team. He and Ike Boone were ends on the 1919 team.

References

People from Russellville, Alabama
Sportspeople from Dothan, Alabama
American football tackles
American football halfbacks
Alabama Crimson Tide football players
All-Southern college football players